Almost Love is a 2019 American comedy drama romance film directed, and written by American actor Mike Doyle. It stars Scott Evans, Augustus Prew, Michelle Buteau and Colin Donnell. It was released in the United States on June 26, 2019 and on streaming platforms on August 2, 2020.

Plot
Adam and Marklin are in a 5 year relationship when the passion for each other starts to dim, forcing them to face each other's shortcomings while also watching their close group of friends love lives crumble around them. Their best friend Cammy's latest fling is everything she's looking for in a man, until she finds out that he's homeless and she's unsure if he's seeing her because of her or to have a place to crash. Haley is a teacher and is helping one of her students with the SAT's when he confesses his feeling for her. Then their friends Elizabeth and Damon have been married happily for 15 years when it's not so happy anymore.

Cast
 Scott Evans as Adam
 Augustus Prew as Marklin
 Michelle Buteau as Cammy
 Colin Donnell as Henry
 Zoë Chao as Haley
 Kate Walsh as Elizabeth
 Chaz Lamar Shepherd as Damon
 Christopher Gray as Scott James
 Chris Henry Coffey as Karl
 Nadia Dajani as Nurse Hame
 Brian Marc as Guillermo
 Marilyn Sokol as Peggy
 Patricia Clarkson as Ravella Brewer
 John Doman as Tommy
 Bryce Pinkham as Taylor

Production
The film was set for a theatrical release, but changed to streaming in the midst of the COVID-19 pandemic in the United States.

Reception
Receiving mixed reviews from critics, the film holds a 68% critic score.

References

External links
 

2019 films
2019 comedy films
2010s English-language films